Ego ti eho ke ti tha 'ho (Greek: Εγώ τι έχω και τι θα 'χω) is the name of a studio album by popular Greek singer Tolis Voskopoulos. It was released in 1975 by Minos EMI in Greece.

Track listing 

Side One.
 "Ego ti echo ke ti tha 'cho" (Εγώ τι έχω και τι θα 'χω; What I have and what I'll have?) feat. Marinella – (Giorgos Krimizakis - Sotia Tsotou) – 2:53
 "Se ti kosmo vrethika" (Σε τι κόσμο βρέθηκα; In what world I live?) – (Giorgos Krimizakis) – 3:29
 "An ixeres" (Αν ήξερες; If you knew) feat. Marinella – (Tolis Voskopoulos - Mimis Theiopoulos) – 2:51
 "Tou chronou tetia mera" (Του χρόνου τέτοια μέρα; Next year, same day) – (Giorgos Krimizakis - Sotia Tsotou) – 3:24
 "Kopse tin klosti" (Κόψε την κλωστή; Sever the thread) – (Teris Ieremias - Mimis Theiopoulos) – 2:45
 "Den peirazi" (Δεν πειράζει; No matter) feat. Rena Panta – (Stelios Zafeiriou - Pythagoras) – 2:41
Side Two.
 "Dio kardies" (Δυο καρδιές; Two hearts) – (Teris Ieremias - Mimis Theiopoulos) – 2:01
 "Rotise na mathis" (Ρώτησε να μάθεις; Asked to learn) feat. Rena Panta – (Tolis Voskopoulos - Mimis Theiopoulos) – 2:41
 "Pia ise 'sy" (Ποια είσαι 'συ; Who are you?) – (Tolis Voskopoulos - Mimis Theiopoulos) – 2:21
 "Imaste anthropi apli" (Είμαστε άνθρωποι απλοί; We're simple people) – (Giorgos Krimizakis - Sotia Tsotou) – 2:51
 "Ti eyines" (Τι έγινες; What happened to you?) – (Tolis Voskopoulos - Mimis Theiopoulos) – 3:13
 "Giati den erchese" (Γιατί δεν έρχεσαι; Why don't you come over?) – (Stelios Zafeiriou - Pythagoras) – 3:08

Personnel 
 Tolis Voskopoulos - vocals, background vocals
 Marinella - background vocals
 Rena Panta - background vocals
 Achilleas Theofilou - producer

References

1975 albums
Tolis Voskopoulos albums
Greek-language albums
Minos EMI albums